Jack Anderton was an English rugby union and rugby league footballer who played from the 1880s to 1900s. He played at representative level for British Isles, and at club level for Wigan (two spells); the second spell was after the 1895 schism, and Salford, as a three-quarter. Prior to Thursday 29 August 1895, Wigan were a rugby union club, and prior to Tuesday 2 June 1896, Salford were a rugby union club.

Background
Jack Anderton was born in Wigan, Lancashire.

Playing career
Anderton joined Salford from Wigan. He spent two seasons at the club, appearing 52 times. He left the club in 1889 and returned to Wigan.

International honours
Jack Anderton won cap(s) for British Isles while at Salford on the 1888 British Lions tour to New Zealand and Australia.

County honours
Jack Anderton won one cap for Lancashire against Cumberland on 28 February 1889.

Notable tour matches
Jack Anderton played in the three-quarters for Salford in the 1-7 defeat by the 1888–1889 New Zealand Native football team at New Barnes (Salford Docks) on Saturday 16 March 1889.

References

External links
Search for "Anderton" at espn.co.uk (1888 British Isles tourists statistics missing (31 December 2017))
Statistics at lionsrugby.com
Football – British Football Team’s Visit To New Zealand.
The Return Of The English Team To Their Native Land
Football. A team of British Rugby footballers visited the colonies in April
Notes By Full Back
Lions tour to Australia, 1888... and 2013 
The 1888 Tour - In their own words

British & Irish Lions rugby union players from England
English rugby league players
English rugby union players
Lancashire County RFU players
Place of death missing
Rugby league players from Wigan
Rugby union players from Wigan
Rugby union three-quarters
Salford Red Devils players
Wigan Warriors players
Year of birth missing
Year of death missing